The 2015–16 Cyprus Basketball Division A was the 49th season of the Cyprus Basketball Division A, the top-tier level professional basketball league on Cyprus. The season started on November 6, 2015, and ended on May 3, 2016. AEK Larnaca won the previous championship, and successfully defended its title.

Competition format
The participating teams first play a conventional round-robin schedule, with every team playing each opponent once "home" and once "away", for a total of 14 games. The league is then split up into two groups of four teams, with each of them playing teams within its group in a home-and-away cycle of games. The bottom four clubs play for one direct relegation spot, and one relegation play-off spot. Records earned in the first round are taken over to the respective Second round.

The four teams of the top group will join the championship playoffs.

Regular season

Rounds 1-14

Rounds 15-20

Playoffs

Bracket

Quarter-finals

Semi-finals

Finals

Finals

Playout

First Leg

Second Leg

References

Cyprus
Basketball
Basketball
Cyprus Basketball Division 1